Charles or Charlie Bradley may refer to:

Sports
Charles Bradley (basketball) (born 1959), retired American basketball player
Charlie Bradley (basketball) (born 1963), American basketball player
Charles Bradley (footballer) (1922–1984), English professional footballer
Charles Bradley (bowls) (born 1919), Rhodesian lawn bowler

Others
Charles Bradley (doctor) (1902–1979), American physician who did early work on using stimulants for behavioural disorder
Charles Bradley (preacher) (1789–1871), preacher and sermon writer
Charles Bradley (sailor) (1838–?), Irish sailor who fought in the American Civil War
Charles Bradley (singer) (1948–2017), American singer
Charles C. Bradley (1911–2002), American professor of geology
Charles H. Bradley Jr. (1899–1972), American businessman
Charles S. Bradley (1819–1888), American judge

See also
Chuck Bradley (disambiguation)